Sue Robbie is a British television presenter and voiceover artist. Born Susan Robinson on 5 July 1949 in London, she grew up in North West England and attended Keele University, where she read English and psychology. Before working in television, she was a schoolteacher at Hazel Grove High School, a volunteer at a halfway house for drug addicts, a warden at a children's home, an air hostess and a management trainee on a two-year course.

She was a continuity announcer for Granada Television in the late-1970s and early-1980s and frequently appeared with fellow Granada announcer Charles Foster. Both Robbie and Foster were narrators of Granada's highly acclaimed schools programmes for the ITV network.

She then presented other Granada shows for the ITV network, including Emergency, First Post, Connections (as the original host, and in which Foster announced the prizes, before being replaced by Richard Madeley as the show moved to a prime-time slot), Hold Tight! (where she replaced the Selecter vocalist Pauline Black) and TX (where she starred alongside a young Tony Slattery). She was also an occasional presenter and expert guest in the early years of ITV's This Morning show.

As well as her work for Granada, Robbie also presented The Dodo Club, a children's wildlife programme produced by Channel Television between 1987 and 1990.

She presented "Video Active" on BBC2 in 1987, 6 introductory guides to making home videos.

She retired from television in the early 1990s and now works as a voice-over artist and occasionally in corporate events.  In 2001 her voice was heard in Ken Loach's film, The Navigators.

References

External links
 
 Sue Robbie's professional profile at VoiceBank

1949 births
Living people
Radio and television announcers
British game show hosts
Alumni of Keele University